Shalu Lochen Legpa Gyaltsen ((Wylie: zhwa lo lu chen rgyal mtshan legs pa)) (1375–1450)  was a Tibetan spiritual leader.  He was the fourth Ganden Tripa of the Gelug school of Tibetan Buddhism from 1438 to 1450.

He was born in Tsang Zhalu (gtsang zhwa lu) in 1375, and was ordained at Zhalu Monastery (zhwa lu dgon pa). He was the first umdze at Ganden Namgyel Ling (dga' ldan rmam rgyal gling).

References

Ganden Tripas
1375 births
1450 deaths
15th-century religious leaders